Helga Aradóttir (1538–1614) was the daughter of Ari Jónsson and the granddaughter of bishop Jón Arason of Hólar, both of whom were executed in 1550. Her mother Halldóra Þorleifsdóttir, Ari Jónsson's wife, also died while Helga was still a young girl, and she was raised by relatives.

Helga came from a wealthy family and was well educated by sixteenth-century standards; she was by no means docile and passive. Páll Jónsson (Staðarhóls-Páll), a member of the powerful Svalbarð family who was both a poet and a high-ranking administrative official, courted Helga despite strenuous opposition from Helga's grandfather, and he composed adoring love poems to her that have survived in manuscripts. Although the pair eventually married and had children, their relationship was stormy and they separated.

Unusually for the sixteenth century, Páll Jónsson attempted to obtain a legal divorce from Helga so that he could marry Halldóra Guðbrandsdóttir, daughter of bishop Guðbrandur Þorláksson of Hólar, although neither Halldóra nor her father seem to have approved of this. Páll made various accusations against Helga, including that she had attempted to retain control of her own property after marriage, and composed vicious verses about her. When the case was brought to the Alþingi, Páll was refused his divorce, and the couple remained officially married until Páll's death in 1598.

References

Illa konu eiga hlaut. Fálkinn, 4. tbl. 1963.“,
„Staðarhóls-Páll. Sunnudagsblað Tímans, 19. apríl 1964.“,
„Staðarhóls-Páll. Þjóðviljinn, 24. desember 1954.“,

16th-century Icelandic people
17th-century Icelandic people
1538 births
1614 deaths
16th-century Icelandic women
17th-century Icelandic women